Reed Township may refer to:

 Reed Township, Washington County, Arkansas
 Reed Township, Will County, Illinois
 Reed Township, Cass County, North Dakota, in Cass County, North Dakota
 Reed Township, Seneca County, Ohio
 Reed Township, Dauphin County, Pennsylvania
 

Township name disambiguation pages